Nomic is a game created in 1982 by philosopher Peter Suber, the  of which include mechanisms for changing those rules, usually beginning by way of democratic voting. The game demonstrates that in any system where rule changes are possible, a situation may arise in which the resulting laws are contradictory or insufficient to determine what is in fact legal.

Gameplay
All aspects of Nomic are variable; the players can vote to change the rules to whatever sort of game they want to play. The initial  was designed by Peter Suber, and was first published in Douglas Hofstadter's "Metamagical Themas" column in the June 1982 edition of Scientific American. Hofstadter discussed Suber's book The Paradox of Self-Amendment, in which Suber defined the game thus:

Initially, gameplay occurs in clockwise order, with each player taking a turn. In that turn, they propose a change in rules that all the other players vote on, and then roll a die to determine the number of points they add to their score. If this rule change is passed, it comes into effect at the end of their round. Any rule can be changed with varying degrees of difficulty, including the core rules of the game itself. As such, the gameplay may quickly change. The game can be played face-to-face with as many written notes as are required, or through any of a number of Internet media (usually an archived mailing list or Internet forum).

Immutable rules take precedence over mutable ones, and must be changed into mutable rules (called ) before they can be modified or removed. 

A rule change may be:

 the addition of a new mutable rule
 the amendment of a mutable rule
 the repeal of a mutable rule
 the transmutation of a rule from mutable to immutable, or
 the transmutation of a rule from immutable to mutable

While the victory condition in Suber's initial ruleset is the accumulation of 100 points by the roll of dice, he once said that "this rule is deliberately boring so that players will quickly amend it to please themselves". Any rule in the game, including the rules specifying the criteria for winning and even the rule that rules must be obeyed, can be changed.

Online

Nomic is particularly suited to being played online, where all proposals and rules can be shared in web pages or email archives for ease of reference. Such games can last for a very long time: Agora has been running since 1993. The longevity of nomic games can pose a serious problem, in that the rulesets can grow so complex that some participants do not fully understand them, and prospective players are deterred from joining. One currently active game, BlogNomic, gets around this problem by dividing the game into "dynasties"; every time someone wins, a new dynasty begins, and all the rules except a privileged few are repealed. This keeps the game relatively simple and accessible. Nomicron (now defunct) was similar in that it had rounds – when a player won a round, a convention was started to plan for the next round. A game of Nomic on reddit,  (now defunct), used a similar mechanism modeled on Nomicron's system.

Another facet of Nomic is the way in which the implementation of the rules affects the way the game of Nomic itself works. ThermodyNomic, for example, had a ruleset in which rule changes were carefully considered before implementation, and rules were rarely introduced which provide loopholes for the players to exploit. B Nomic, by contrast, was once described by one of its players as "the equivalent of throwing logical hand grenades".

While Nomic is traditionally capitalized as the proper name of the game it describes, it has also sometimes been used in a more informal way as a lowercased generic term, nomic, referring to anything with Nomic-like characteristics, including games where the rules may be changed during play as well as non-gaming situations where it can be alleged that "rules lawyers" are tinkering with the process used to amend rules and policies (in an organization or community) in a manner akin to a game of Nomic.

Variants
Many variants of Nomic exist, all based on the initial ruleset. Some that have themes, begin with a single rule, or begin with a dictator instead of a democratic process to validate rules. Others combine Nomic with an existing game—such as Monopoly or chess, or, in one humorously paradoxical attempt, the improvisational game Mornington Crescent. Even more unusual variants include a ruleset in which the rules are hidden from players' view, and a game which, instead of allowing voting on rules, splits into two sub-games, one with the rule, and one without it.

In a computerized Nomic, the rules are interpreted by a computer, rather than by humans. This implies that the rules should be written in a language that a computer can understand, typically some sort of programming language or Game Description Language. Nomyx is such an implementation.

See also

 Mao
 Bartok
 Dvorak
 21
 1000 Blank White Cards
 King's Cup
 Fluxx
 Calvinball
 Baba Is You

References

External links
 The Original Initial Ruleset, as created by Peter Suber
 The Nomic page of Peter Suber contains, among other things, a list of Nomic games past and present.
 agoranomic.org is the homepage of Agora Nomic, one of the oldest living nomics.
 The Fantasy Rules Committee, which originated as a sub-game of another nomic but has since grown into a game in its own right. Arguably the oldest living nomic.

Games of mental skill
Games and sports introduced in 1982